MV Empire MacCallum was a grain ship converted to become a Merchant Aircraft Carrier or MAC ship.

History
MV Empire MacCallum was built at Lithgows shipyard, Glasgow, Scotland, under order from the Ministry of War Transport. As a MAC ship, only her air crew and the necessary maintenance staff were naval personnel and she was operated by Hain Steam Ship Co Ltd of St Ives. On 7 July 1944, a Fairey Swordfish aircraft mistakenly sank the Free French submarine  in the Atlantic Ocean off the coast of Newfoundland. Amongst the aircraft that served on Empire MacCallum was Fairey Swordfish Mk II LS326 where it became part of 'K' flight. As of November 2010, it is airworthy with the Royal Navy Historic Flight.

After the war, the ship was converted to a grain carrier, and eventually scrapped at Osaka in 1960.

See also 
 List of aircraft carriers

References

External links
 FAA history of Empire MacCallum

World War II aircraft carriers of the United Kingdom
Bulk carriers
Grain ships
Empire MacCallum
Empire ships
1943 ships